Nathan Smith (born February 9, 1982) is a Canadian former professional ice hockey player from Sherwood Park, Alberta. He played in the National Hockey League with the Vancouver Canucks, Pittsburgh Penguins and the Minnesota Wild.

Playing career
Smith was a first-round draft pick, drafted 23rd overall in the 2000 NHL Entry Draft by the Vancouver Canucks. After spending four seasons with the Swift Current Broncos of the Western Hockey League, Smith signed his first professional contract with the Canucks on May 31, 2002. He made his professional debut in the American Hockey League with the Manitoba Moose in the 2002-03 season. His time spent in the Vancouver organization was filled with injuries, including a near-career-ending knee injury suffered during his 3rd season.

Smith signed as a free agent with the Pittsburgh Penguins on July 12, 2007. On April 27, 2008, Smith played in over 13 games for the Pittsburgh Penguins. He also scored his first NHL goal which was later called off. Smith served as captain for the AHL affiliate team, the Wilkes-Barre/Scranton Penguins, and took his team to the Calder Cup finals, which they lost to the Chicago Wolves in game 5 of the finals.

On July 10, 2008, Smith signed a one-year deal with the Colorado Avalanche. He was assigned to affiliate, the Lake Erie Monsters of the AHL, for the 2008–09 season, and served as captain before suffering a season-ending knee injury on January 23, 2009.

On July 22, 2009, Smith signed a one-year deal with the Minnesota Wild. In the 2009–10 season, Smith made his return to the NHL on October 14, 2009, in a 3-2 defeat to the Anaheim Ducks. He played in 9 games with the Wild throughout the season, but primarily played with its AHL affiliate, the Houston Aeros, scoring 37 points in 67 games.

On August 6, 2010, Smith left North America and signed a one-year contract with German team Augsburger Panther of the DEL where he served as team captain.

Smith returned to the American Hockey League the following season in 2011–12, signing a one-year contract with the Syracuse Crunch on August 11, 2011. Limited to 18 games, Smith suffered a career-ending concussion at the beginning of the season.

Career statistics

References

External links

1982 births
Augsburger Panther players
Canadian ice hockey centres
Houston Aeros (1994–2013) players
Lake Erie Monsters players
Living people
Manitoba Moose players
Minnesota Wild players
National Hockey League first-round draft picks
Pittsburgh Penguins players
Ice hockey people from Edmonton
Swift Current Broncos players
Syracuse Crunch players
Vancouver Canucks draft picks
Vancouver Canucks players
Wilkes-Barre/Scranton Penguins players
Canadian expatriate ice hockey players in Germany